Marquess of los Vélez is a Spanish noble title awarded in 1507 to the Spanish military Fajardo family.

Pedro Fajardo

The first to hold the title was Pedro Fajardo, the first son of Luisa Fajardo y Manrique. In 1477 she married a powerful Royal Accountant and financier named "Juan Chacón", a new nobleman jure uxoris. He was allowed by the Catholic Monarchs to use, as a privilege, his family name as "Pedro Fajardo y Chacón".

Luisa Fajardo y Manrique

Luisa Fajardo y Manrique, Lady of Cartagena, came from an important military family, with institutional powers over conquered Muslim lands in Murcia, Granada and Almeria. The marquisate was awarded on 15 October 1507 by Queen Joanna I of Castile. The awarded title of Grandee of Spain was given to the Fajardo family in 1520 by her eldest son,  King Charles I of Spain.

List of Marquesses of los Vélez 
The current Marquess is also known as Count of Niebla, Marquess of Villafranca del Bierzo (with Grandeza).

See also
 Vélez (name)

References

 
1507 establishments in Spain